Andrew Jackson High School was a public high school in Portland, Oregon, United States. It was in the Portland Public Schools and closed in 1982. The building is now used as Jackson Middle School, which uses the Artful Learning teaching philosophy.

References

External links
Andrew Jackson School Historic Resource Inventory

High schools in Portland, Oregon
Defunct schools in Oregon
Educational institutions disestablished in 1982
1982 disestablishments in Oregon
Portland Public Schools (Oregon)